Sphaerotrypes cristatus, is a species of weevil found in Sri Lanka. Larval host plants are Calophyllum, Shorea cordifolia, and Vateria copallifera.

References 

Curculionidae
Insects of Sri Lanka
Beetles described in 1988